The Statistical Committee of Armenia, or ArmStat in short, is the national statistical agency of Armenia.

History 
The statistical institution started its main activities on 7 January 1922 and was previously known as the Statistical Department of Soviet Socialist Republic of Armenia. It was also previously known as:
National Statistical Service of the Republic of Armenia (May 2000- April 2018)
Ministry of Statistics, State Register and Analysis of the Republic of Armenia (April 1998-May 2000),
State Department of Statistics, State Register and Analysis of the Republic of Armenia (1992-1998),
State Statistical Committee of the Soviet Socialist Republic of Armenia (1987-1992).

International cooperation 
Armenia joined the International Monetary Fund's Special Data Dissemination Standard on 7 November 2003, being the third member of the Commonwealth of Independent States to join. From 1 January 2009, Armenia was a member of the United Nations Statistical Commission until the end of 2012.

See also 
 Census in Armenia
 Government of Armenia
 List of national and international statistical services

References

External links 
 
 Statistical Committee of Armenia on Facebook

Armenia
Government agencies of Armenia